Chillanes Canton is a canton of Ecuador, located in the Bolívar Province.  Its capital is the town of Chillanes.  Its population at the 2001 census was 18,685.

Demographics
Ethnic groups as of the Ecuadorian census of 2010:
Mestizo  91.9%
Indigenous  3.8%
White  2.2%
Afro-Ecuadorian  1.3%
Montubio  0.7%
Other  0.1%

References

Cantons of Bolívar Province (Ecuador)